Hyphomicrobium zavarzinii is a bacterium from the genus of Hyphomicrobium which was isolated from swampy soil in Moscow in Russia

References

Further reading

 

Hyphomicrobiales
Bacteria described in 1989